Gift Motupa (born 23 September 1994) is a South African professional soccer player who plays as a midfielder for South African Premier Division side Mamelodi Sundowns.

Club career
Motupa started his career at Baroka before joining Orlando Pirates in 2015. He spent the 2017–18 season on loan at Baroka.

He was sold to Chippa United in May 2018, but was sold to Bidvest Wits in July 2018 without playing a single match for Chippa United.

He joined Mamelodi Sundowns on a five-year contract in September 2020.

International career

International goals
Scores and results list South Africa's goal tally first.

Career Statistics

References

External links 
 
 

1994 births
Living people
South African soccer players
Association football midfielders
Orlando Pirates F.C. players
2015 Africa U-23 Cup of Nations players
Footballers at the 2016 Summer Olympics
Olympic soccer players of South Africa
South Africa international soccer players